PC Tools may refer to:

 PC Tools (company), a security software company, best known for Spyware Doctor
 PC Tools (magazine), a UK-based computer magazine
 PC Tools (software), a collection of software utilities for MS-DOS and Windows 3.x